Sturgis is a home rule-class city in Union County, Kentucky, United States. The population was 1,898 at the 2010 census. Located in northwest Kentucky, the city was founded in 1890 and named for Samuel Sturgis, who owned the land now occupied by the city.

History 
The area surrounding what would become Sturgis was first settled by American Revolutionary War officers, mostly from Virginia, who had received bounty land for their service. The History of Union County, published in 1886 by The Courier Co., says, "The county had its aristocrats but the [Civil] War had a decidedly leveling tendency yet, there is a tolerably well defined line still marking the society of the county into different sets."

Sturgis was founded the same year as a company town by the Cumberland Land and Iron Company within its coal-mining development. The name derives from either Samuel P. Sturgis, who originally owned the townsite, or for Alida Livingston Sturgis (Samuel's sister), who was married to the president and general manager of the Ohio Valley Railroad Company. The community incorporated as a town on May 3, 1890, with population of 327. The town was reclassified as a city in the 1920s.

Geography 
Sturgis is located at  (37.548269, -87.984535).

Demographics

As of the census of 2000, there were 2,030 people, 854 households, and 578 families residing in the city. The racial makeup of the city was 88.47% White, 9.66% African American, 0.39% Native American, 0.15% Asian, 0.10% from other races, and 1.23% from two or more races. Hispanic or Latino of any race were 1.23% of the population.

There were 854 households, out of which 30.4% had children under the age of 18 living with them, 48.4% were married couples living together, 15.0% had a female householder with no husband present, and 32.3% were non-families. 31.0% of all households were made up of individuals, and 18.3% had someone living alone who was 65 years of age or older. The average household size was 2.34 and the average family size was 2.90.

In the city, the population was spread out, with 24.3% under the age of 18, 8.8% from 18 to 24, 24.3% from 25 to 44, 23.4% from 45 to 64, and 19.1% who were 65 years of age or older. The median age was 39 years. For every 100 females, there were 81.3 males. For every 100 females age 18 and over, there were 79.1 males.

The median income for a household in the city was $28,664, and the median income for a family was $34,922. Males had a median income of $30,435 versus $18,295 for females. The per capita income for the city was $14,124. About 13.7% of families and 16.0% of the population were below the poverty line, including 19.7% of those under age 18 and 16.9% of those age 65 or over.

Education
Public education in Sturgis is administered by Union County Public Schools.  The district operates Sturgis Elementary School, Union County Middle School, and Union County High School.

Sturgis has a lending library, a branch of the Union County Public Library.

Climate
The climate in this area is characterized by hot, humid summers and generally mild to cool winters.  According to the Köppen Climate Classification system, Sturgis has a humid subtropical climate, abbreviated "Cfa" on climate maps.

References

Populated places established in 1886
Cities in Union County, Kentucky
Cities in Kentucky